Carry On Cruising is a 1962 British comedy film, the sixth in the series of 31 Carry On films (1958–1992). It was based on an original story by Eric Barker. P&O – Orient Lines were thanked in the credits. Regulars Sid James, Kenneth Williams and Kenneth Connor appear in the film, whereas Joan Sims and Charles Hawtrey do not. Sims took ill shortly before filming began and was replaced by Dilys Laye, making her Carry On debut, at four days' notice. Hawtrey was dropped for demanding star billing,  but returned for the next entry, making this the only entry during Hawtrey's 23-film run which he missed. Sims returned two years later in Carry On Cleo. Liz Fraser notches up the second of her four appearances here. Lance Percival makes his only appearance in the series in Carry On Cruising, playing the ship's chef, the role originally designated for Hawtrey. The Australian actor Vincent Ball also makes his first, of two, Carry On appearances. This was the last film to have its screenplay written by Norman Hudis. This film was notable for being the first in the series to be filmed in colour.

Plot
Captain Crowther (Sid James) has five of his crew replaced at short notice before a new cruise voyage begins. Not only does he get the five most incompetent crew men ever to sail the seven seas, but the passengers turn out to be a rather strange bunch too.

The SS Happy Wanderer is the cruise ship and after this voyage, Crowther hopes to get a job as captain on a transatlantic ship, promising the crew members their jobs will be safe under the new captain.  Starting off from England, the Happy Wanderer calls at unnamed ports in Spain, Italy and North Africa before going home again.

Single ladies Gladys (Liz Fraser) and Flo (Dilys Laye) take the cruise, with Flo hoping to find a husband. Bridget (Esma Cannon) is her usual dotty and entertaining self, and one unnamed passenger (Ronnie Stevens) never disembarks but always goes straight to the bar to drink, to forget an unidentified woman. The crew and passengers settle in as the ship leaves port and head chef Wilfred Haines (Lance Percival) finds out he is seasick. Mario Fabrizi makes a quick appearance as one of the cooks under Haines. Ed Devereaux, best known for the part of Matt Hammond in the Australian TV series 'Skippy', appears as a Young Officer.

Gladys and Flo fall for the PT instructor Mr Jenkins but nothing comes of it, especially when Flo turns out to be hopeless in the gym. Meanwhile, the new men try to impress Crowther but disaster follows disaster with him getting knocked out and covered in food at a party.

Meanwhile, ship's doctor Dr. Binn (Kenneth Connor) has fallen for Flo, but she wants nothing to do with him so he serenades her with a song after leaving Italy (Bella Marie, sung by Roberto Cardinali), which she does not hear as she is asleep. Gladys, who has heard the song, realises that Flo is in love with Binn and with the help of First Officer Marjoribanks (Kenneth Williams) arranges a plot for Binn and Flo to get together. It works and the confident Binn finally confesses his feelings to a gobsmacked Flo, who returns his affections.

Crowther lets the five newcomers know that they have improved since the cruise began, simply by doing their jobs and not by trying to impress him. They learn that the Captain has been in charge of the Happy Wanderer for ten years and decide to hold a surprise party for him, with the passengers. Haines bakes him a many-flavoured cake and the barman cables the former barman for the recipe of the Captain's favourite drink, the Aberdeen Angus.

The party goes well and Crowther gets his telegram telling him he has the captaincy of the new ship. He turns it down as he recognises it does not have the personal touch of a cruise ship, and prefers the company of his own crew.

Cast
Sid James as Captain Wellington Crowther
Kenneth Williams as First Officer Leonard Marjoribanks
Kenneth Connor as Dr Arthur Binn
Liz Fraser as Glad Trimble
Dilys Laye as Flo Castle
Esma Cannon as Bridget Madderley
Lance Percival as Wilfred Haines, Ship's Cook.
Jimmy Thompson as Sam Turner
Ronnie Stevens as Drunk
Vincent Ball as Jenkins
Cyril Chamberlain as Tom Tree
Willoughby Goddard as Large Man
Ed Devereaux as Young officer
Brian Rawlinson as Steward
Anton Rodgers as Young man
Anthony Sagar as Cook
Terence Holland as Passer-by
Mario Fabrizi as Cook
Evan David as Bridegroom
Marian Collins as Bride
Jill Mai Meredith as Shapely miss
Alan Casley as Kindly seaman

Crew
Screenplay – Norman Hudis
Story – Eric Barker
Music – Bruce Montgomery & Douglas Gamley
Director of Photography – Alan Hume
Art Director – Carmen Dillon
Editor – John Shirley
Production Manager – Bill Hill
Camera Operator – Dudley Lovell
Assistant Director – Jack Causey
Sound Editors – Arthur Ridout & Archie Ludski
Sound Recordists – Robert T MacPhee & Bill Daniels
Continuity – Penny Daniels
Make-up – George Blackler & Geoffrey Rodway
Hairdressing – Biddy Crystal
Costume Designer – Joan Ellacott
Casting Director – Betty White
Beachwear – Silhouette (lingerie)
Producer – Peter Rogers
Director – Gerald Thomas

Filming and locations
Filming dates – 8 January-16 February 1962

Interiors:
 Pinewood Studios, Buckinghamshire, England

Exteriors
 Southampton Docks

Reception
The film was the 12th most popular film at the British box office in 1962. According to Kinematograph Weekly the film was considered a "money maker" at the British box office in 1962.

Bibliography

Keeping the British End Up: Four Decades of Saucy Cinema by Simon Sheridan (third edition) (2007) (Reynolds & Hearn Books)

References

External links

Carry On Cruising at Britmovie
Carry On Films at The Whippit Inn 

1962 films
1962 comedy films
1960s English-language films
Carry On films
Films directed by Gerald Thomas
Films directed by Ralph Thomas
Films scored by Douglas Gamley
Films shot at Pinewood Studios
Seafaring films
Films produced by Peter Rogers
Films with screenplays by Norman Hudis
1960s British films